Sambongsan is a mountain of Jeollanam-do, southwestern South Korea. It has an elevation of 1,187 metres.

See also
List of mountains of Korea

References

Mountains of South Korea
Mountains of South Jeolla Province
Mountains of South Gyeongsang Province
One-thousanders of South Korea